St. Anne's Church in Annaberg-Buchholz, German Free State of Saxony, is a hall church whose architectural style is on the boundary between the Late Gothic and Saxon Renaissance. It is the emblem of the town and visible from a long way off. Saint Anne's was originally built in 1499 as a Roman Catholic church, but became Lutheran in 1539.

Art-historical importance
St. Anne's is considered to be one of the most important examples of Late Gothic architecture. The style of its vivid interior has aspects of very early forms of the Renaissance in Central Europe, as well as those of the Late Gothic era. Its tall, mostly strictly vertical style, typical of the older Gothic, is achieved here using imaginative, intricate designs and arches. The style of the Italian Renaissance, which is a throw back to antiquity, is reflected in places in the architectural sculpture and altar pieces.

St. Anne's Church is the most advanced representative of a range of religious buildings that emerged in the late 15th and early 16th centuries especially in upper Saxony. Economic prosperity - promoted by rich silver yields - resulted in an intensive period of construction in the Ore Mountains at that time. The design of St. Anne's is reflected in other churches, including Freiberg Cathedral, St. Mary's at Marienberg and St. Wolfgang's at Schneeberg. A clear similarity in interior design is particularly evident in St. Barbara's Church, Kutná Hora in Bohemian Kuttenberg (Kutná Hora).

In a renovation programme that lasted more than 20 years, many later alterations and changes were removed so that the inside of St. Anne's Church today has been substantially restored to its original state in the 16th century.

Sources 
 Hans Burckhardt: Kruzifixe und Kreuzigungsgruppen in der St. Annenkirche zu Annaberg. in: Sächsische Heimatblätter, Ed. 6/1981, pp. 275–283.
 Heinrich Magirius: Die St.-Annen-Kirche zu Annaberg. Berlin, 1985. (Reihe Das christliche Denkmal).
 Heinrich Magirius: St. Annen zu Annaberg. Schnell & Steiner, München/Zürich, 1991. (Reihe: Großer Kunstführer).
 Hans Burckhardt: Dich ruft mein Ton zum Dienst des Herrn ... Schicksale Annaberger Kirchenglocken. Annaberg-Buchholz, 1998.
 Horst Richter: Restaurierung der St. Annenkirche, Annaberg-Buchholz, Annaberg-Buchholz, 1999. (Kirchenvorstand St. Annen).
 Rolf Kunze: 500 Jahre Annaberg – Die St. Annenkirche, Zeugnis der Blüte bergmännischer Kultur. In: Erzgebirgische Heimatblätter 6/1995, pp. 2–7, .

External links 
 
 Website of the Lutheran parish of Annaberg-Buchholz and St. Anne's Church

Annaberg-Buchholz, Anne
Anne
Annaberg-Buchholz, Anne
Annaberg-Buchholz, Anne
Buildings and structures in Erzgebirgskreis
Church buildings with domes